Antonio Margheriti (19 September 1930 – 4 November 2002), also known under the pseudonyms Anthony M. Dawson and Antony Daisies ("daisies" is "margherite" in Italian), was an Italian filmmaker. Margheriti worked in many different genres in the Italian film industry, and was known for his sometimes derivative but often stylish and entertaining science fiction, sword and sandal, horror/giallo, Eurospy, Spaghetti Western, Vietnam War and action movies that were released to a wide international audience. He died in 2002.

Early life and career
Antonio Margheriti was born in Rome on 19 September 1930. Margheriti was the son of a railroad engineer and began his film career in 1950 working with Mario Serandrei. He then began making short documentaries beginning with Vecchia Roma in 1953. In 1954, Margheriti was credited with special effects in films such as Pino Mercanti's I cinque dell'Adamello and La notte che la terra tremo. By 1955 he was credited in screenplays such as Classe di ferro.

Directing
Margheriti grew up reading science fiction comics, and when he was offered the film Space-Men, he signed on as director. He followed up this film with Battle of the Worlds starring actor Claude Rains, which was in turn followed by The Golden Arrow with Tab Hunter and some more peplum-style films such as The Fall of Rome and Giants of Rome. Other genres tackled in the 1960s included horror—Castle of Blood, The Long Hair of Death and The Virgin of Nuremberg and the Eurospy film: Bob Fleming... Mission Casablanca and Operazione Goldman.

Margheriti then returned to science fiction with his Gamma I series, originally filmed for the Italian television series Fantascienza but afterwards released theatrically. Margheriti followed these films with some westerns, including Take a Hard Ride and And God Said to Cain.

In the 1980s, Margheriti created films following the success of Platoon and Raiders of the Lost Ark, such as The Last Hunter and Hunters of the Golden Cobra, which both starred David Warbeck. Warbeck also starred in Tiger Joe, a film overshadowed by tragedy when Margheriti's long time cinematographer, Riccardo Pallottini, died in a plane crash while attempting to get the film's last shot.

He delved into the genre of films inspired by The Wild Geese with Code Name: Wild Geese and Commando Leopard starring Lewis Collins as well as Conan the Barbarian (1982) with Yor, the Hunter from the Future, which was shot in Turkey and was picked up by Columbia Pictures for an American release to 1400 theaters.

Margheriti died on 4 November 2002.

Style
Margheriti's specialty in films was low budget efforts that fell into genres such as action and science fiction. To make films in short amounts of time, Margheriti applied techniques such as shooting with several cameras simultaneously, allowing him to record master shots, close-ups, and more. This often led him to light films very carefully, and allowed him to create several films per year.

Partial filmography
Note: The films listed as N/A are not necessarily chronological.

Legacy
In the documentary on the Image DVD release of his film Cannibal Apocalypse, Margheriti proudly mentioned that it was Quentin Tarantino's favorite among his films. In Tarantino's film Inglourious Basterds, Eli Roth's character Donnie Donowitz uses "Antonio Margheriti" as an alias in an undercover operation at the cinema screening of Stolz der Nation. There is also a reference in Tarantino's film, Once Upon a Time in Hollywood. In said film, Leonardo DiCaprio portrays the fictional actor Rick Dalton, who goes to Italy in 1969 to film Spaghetti Westerns, including one spy thriller directed by Margheriti titled Operazione Dyn-o-mite.

References

Footnotes

Sources

External links
Stefano Bigliardi, "Mr. Superinvisible’s Potion: Science, Scientists and Technology in Antonio Margheriti’s Films," Simulteanea. A Journal of Italian Media and Pop Culture - Rivista di media e cultura popolare in Italia, Vol. 2, N. 1. 
 
 Article at Senses of Cinema
 
 Thesis on Margheriti

1930 births
2002 deaths
Italian film producers
Horror film directors
20th-century Italian screenwriters
Italian male screenwriters
Spaghetti Western directors
Science fiction film directors
Writers from Rome
Film directors from Rome
Giallo film directors
20th-century Italian male writers